Pelham Parkway may refer to:
Pelham Parkway, in the Bronx.
Pelham Parkway (neighborhood), Bronx
Pelham Parkway (IRT Dyre Avenue Line), a station served by the 
Pelham Parkway (IRT White Plains Road Line), a station served by the